William Richard Orr (17 May 1883 – 6 June 1963) was an Australian rules footballer who played with Carlton in the Victorian Football League (VFL). He also played for North Fremantle, Perth and Subiaco in the West Australian Football League (WAFL).

Notes

External links 

Billy Orr's profile at Blueseum

1883 births
1963 deaths
Australian rules footballers from Victoria (Australia)
Carlton Football Club players
North Fremantle Football Club players
Perth Football Club players
Subiaco Football Club players
West Australian Football Hall of Fame inductees
People from Sale, Victoria